Ludwik Dutkiewicz (2 February 1921 – 2008) was a Ukrainian-born Australian artist. He was born in Stara Sil, Ukraine (then a part of Poland) on 2 February 1921. He won the 1953 and 1954 Cornell Prize.

Career
Dutkiewicz was appointed as botanical illustrator to the Adelaide Botanic Gardens in 1953. He illustrated numerous botanical books including as a contributing illustrator to Flora of Australia.

Collections
Dutkiewicz's works are held in the collections of the Art Gallery of South Australia (Green Village, Classic abstract, Life drawing of seated nude, Time in Summer (film still), and Portrait of David Dallwitz.); the Australian Centre for the Moving Image (Transfiguration); the Newcastle Art Gallery (Recluse); the State Library of South Australia (Portrait of a ballerina 'Natasha'''); the Heide Museum of Modern Art (Landscape with Arches); the
National Film and Sound Archive (Reflections (short film), 1962, Director; Time In Summer (feature film), 1968, Director; and Transfiguration (short film), 1964, Producer.); Flinders University Museum of Art (Untitled, line drawing, and Untitled, oil painting.); and the 
South Australian Society of Arts  (Didgeridoo).

Exhibitions
His work has been exhibited at the Ukrainian Institute of Modern Art (Australian Artists from Ukraine, group), Flinders University Museum of Art (Ludwik Dutkiewicz: the Dangerfield collection), the Royal SA Society of Arts Gallery (Untitled, 1951, group; Adelaide 1952 Group, 1952, group; and Untitled, 1954, solo), and the Toorak Art Gallery (From Boyd to Wakelin, 1968,  group).

Awards
He won the Cornell Prize in 1953 (Boats after Storm), and 1954 (Green Village'').

References

20th-century Australian painters
Artists from South Australia
Australian male painters
1921 births
2008 deaths
People from Lviv Oblast
Australian film directors
Australian film producers